Kumarathurai Arunasalam (Tamil: அருணாசலம் குமராதுரை; May 25, 1939 - 22 January 2019) was the founder of Kumarapuram, a small village in Trincomalee District of Sri Lanka’s Eastern Province. He is younger brother of late Tamil United Liberation Front (TULF) Member of Parliament for Trincomalee District, A. Thangathurai.

Publications
 இலக்கை அரசியல் வரலாறு - இழப்புகளும் பதிவுகளும், 2012.

See also
 Kumarapuram massacre

References

 Trincomalee District in February 1996: Focusing on the Killiveddy Massacre, UTHR(J) Information Bulletin No.10, Date of Release: 2 March 1996

External links
 Murder in Trincomalee and the Tamil predicament

Sri Lankan Hindus
Sri Lankan Tamil people
1939 births
2019 deaths